Andrew Grant may refer to:

 Andrew Grant (writer) (born 1968), British novelist
 Andrew Grant (MP) (1830–1924), Scottish Liberal politician
 Andrew Grant (physician), physician and writer
 Andrew Grant (volleyball) (born 1985), Australian volleyball player
 Andrew Grant (minister), Scottish minister
 Andy Grant (born 1984), middle-distance runner from Saint Vincent and the Grenadines

See also